Senate Joint Resolution 8200 (2019), also known as SJR 8200, is a proposed amendment to the Constitution of Washington that, if enacted, would extend to the Washington Legislature extraordinary powers during a "catastrophic incident", including the authority to fill constitutionally-established offices in the event the entire lines of succession to those offices had been wiped out and to designate a new capital city should Olympia be rendered no longer usable. It was passed by Washington voters in the November, 2019 general election.

Background
The whole of Washington abuts the Cascadia Subduction Zone. According to The New Yorker, predictive modeling of the next full rupture of the zone anticipates it would result in the "worst natural disaster in the history" of North America. The United States' Federal Emergency Management Agency predicts 40,000 casualties and the displacement of one million persons would result from a rupture.

Amendment
In 2019, House Joint Resolution 4200 was passed by the Washington House of Representatives by a vote of 91-7, followed by the Senate version of the same bill - Senate Joint Resolution 8200 - by the Washington Senate in a vote of 37-11. Having achieved the minimum two-thirds required in both chambers, it moved to ratification by public referendum to be held in the scheduled general election of November 2019. It was approved on November 5, 2019.

SJR 8200 amends Article II, Section 42 of the Constitution of Washington to extend to the Washington Legislature extraordinary powers during a "catastrophic incident", including the authority to fill constitutionally-established offices in the event the entire lines of succession to those offices had been wiped out, and to designate a new capital city should Olympia be rendered no longer usable. The Constitution of Washington presently authorizes the Legislature to take similar actions in the event of an "enemy attack" against the state's territory; SJR 8200 was proposed to increase the breadth of situations in which the Legislature could take extraordinary measures to preserve government, specifically due to concerns of an exigency involving the Cascadia Subduction Zone.

Opponents of the amendment, including Senator Bob Hasegawa, have argued that its language was too broad and too vague and could be used by an abusive Governor to seize sweeping powers. Supporters of the amendment, such as Senator Dean Takko, have declaimed such concerns as unrealistic.

See also
 Continuity of government

References

Continuity of government in the United States